Camena may refer to several villages in Romania:

Camena, a village in Cornereva Commune, Caraș-Severin County
Camena, a village in Baia Commune, Tulcea County

Other places
 Camena, Tasmania, a locality in Tasmania, Australia

and to:
Camena, the Romanian name for Kamiana Commune, Storozhynets Raion, Ukraine

and to:
 Camena (goddess), Roman goddess